Kermia thespesia is a species of sea snail, a marine gastropod mollusk in the family Raphitomidae.

Description
The length of the shell attains 6 mm, its diameter 2.5 mm.

(Original description) A beautiful species, by the description and figure allied to Daphnella varicosa (Souverbie & Montrozier, 1874) from the same region. There are, however, no signs of varices. The shell is pure delicate white, with seven or eight whorls, of which three are apical and vitreous brown. The remainder are finely decussate. Where the spiral lines cross the oblique riblets a gemmuliferous appearance is presented. The whorls are squarely ventricose, impressed at the sutures. The coloration consists in orange-brown lines, different in number in every specimen. Some specimens are almost plain, others have a row of square brown spots just below the suture on the body whorl. The aperture is oblong. The outer lip is incrassate, suturally expanded, finely denticulate within. The sinus is broad, but not deep.

Distribution
This marine species occurs off the Loyalty Islands and off Mauritius, Taiwan, New Caledonia and in the Coral Sea.

References

 Hedley, C. 1907. The Mollusca of Mast Head Reef, Capricorn Group, Queensland, part II. Proceedings of the Linnean Society of New South Wales 32: 476–513, pls 16–21 
 Dautzenberg, Ph. (1929). Mollusques testacés marins de Madagascar. Faune des Colonies Francaises, Tome III 
 Zhenguo, Z. 1995. Studies on micromolluscan Turridae of Lüdao Islet, Taiwan. Studia Marina Sinica 36: 273–296, 5 pls
 Liu J.Y. [Ruiyu] (ed.). (2008). Checklist of marine biota of China seas. China Science Press. 1267 pp.

External links
 
 Gastropods.com: Kermia thespesia

thespesia
Gastropods described in 1896